Marc Philippe Ledoux (born 4 March 1986 in La Louvière) is a Belgian Paralympic table tennis player with cerebral palsy. His father, Alain Ledoux, also competed in Paralympic table tennis. Marc Ledoux has won two medals at the 2004 Summer Paralympics. He has won two European titles and also won silver and bronze medals in team events with Mathieu Loicq and Nico Vergeylen.

References 

1986 births
Belgian male table tennis players
Table tennis players at the 2004 Summer Paralympics
Table tennis players at the 2008 Summer Paralympics
Table tennis players at the 2012 Summer Paralympics
Table tennis players at the 2016 Summer Paralympics
Paralympic table tennis players of Belgium
Medalists at the 2004 Summer Paralympics
Paralympic medalists in table tennis
Paralympic gold medalists for Belgium
People from La Louvière
Living people
Sportspeople from Hainaut (province)